Collin Fernandez (born 13 February 1997) is a professional footballer who currently plays for USL Championship club FC Tulsa. Born in the United States, he has most recently represented Peru at youth level.

Career

Professional
On 28 August 2014, Fernandez signed a homegrown player contract with Chicago Fire, making him the fifth homegrown signing in club history and the third in 2014.  However, he was not eligible to play for the first team until 2015.

On 9 June 2015, Fernandez was sent on loan to USL club Louisville City FC. He made his professional debut the following day in a 2–0 victory over FC Montreal.

On 18 July 2019, Fernandez moved from Phoenix Rising FC to Saint Louis FC.

On 14 January 2020, Fernandez signed with Tacoma Defiance.

Fernandez moved to USL Championship side Austin Bold on 21 April 2021.

On 7 February 2022, Fernandez joined MLS Next Pro club Sporting Kansas City II.

Fernandez made the move to USL Championship club FC Tulsa on November 10, 2022.

International
Fernandez has represented the United States in the under-18 and under-20 level. He played for the Peru under-20 team in November 2016.

References

External links

1997 births
Living people
American sportspeople of Peruvian descent
American soccer players
Peruvian footballers
Citizens of Peru through descent
Chicago Fire FC players
Louisville City FC players
Saint Louis FC players
People from Downers Grove, Illinois
Phoenix Rising FC players
Tacoma Defiance players
Austin Bold FC players
Sporting Kansas City II players
Association football midfielders
Soccer players from Illinois
Sportspeople from DuPage County, Illinois
Major League Soccer players
USL Championship players
United States men's youth international soccer players
United States men's under-20 international soccer players
Peru under-20 international footballers
Homegrown Players (MLS)
FC Tulsa players
MLS Next Pro players